The 1918–19 New Mexico Lobos men's basketball team represented the University of New Mexico during the 1918–19 NCAA college men's basketball season. The head coach was John McGough, coaching his first season with the Lobos.

Schedule

|-

References

New Mexico Lobos men's basketball seasons
New Mexico